Douglas Rucker (born December 31, 1927), is an American mid-century style architect, artist and author who has designed more than 80 residential and commercial projects and over 50 remodels/additions in California, Hawaii and Greece.

Early life
Rucker was born in Elmurst, Illinois, to Phil and Eva Rucker, a metalworker and housewife, respectively, and attended grammar school in Chicago. He majored in architectural drawing at Austin High School.

Education and early career
Rucker was awarded a scholarship to, and briefly attended, the Chicago Art Institute. Rucker received his Bachelor of Science (B.S.) in Architecture from the University of Illinois at Urbana-Champaign in 1950; he then worked as a draftsman in Denver and San Diego before moving to Altadena and becoming a licensed architect.  Rucker worked for various firms in the greater Los Angeles region, including architect Ray Jones of Glendale and architecture firm Gilman & Young of Brentwood. In 1957, Rucker opened his own Pacific Palisades firm as part of a partnership and in 1958, he opened his own, eponymous firm in Malibu. During the firm's tenure, Rucker primarily designed single-family, Post and Beam residences in Malibu; some projects were also located in Calabasas, Santa Monica, and Los Angeles. Though now retired from architecture, Rucker lives in California's Santa Monica Mountains.

"Pedestal House"
In 1966, he built his second house, the "Pedestal House," on a Malibu promontory with the main floor sitting atop a forty-foot pedestal. Overlooking the mouth of Malibu Canyon and Surfrider Beach, the home featured views of the Pacific Ocean, Palos Verdes, the Serra Retreat, the Malibu Movie Colony and Catalina island. An architectural success, the house was featured in the Los Angeles Times, and was later included in the AIA’s Malibu Home Tour. On September 25, 1970, the house was destroyed by a brush fire, but two years later, Rucker constructed a new, fire-resistive home on the same foundation as the Pedestal House. This second house was also featured in the Los Angeles Times, and again made part of the AIA Home Tour. The house is currently listed in Gebhard & Winter's Guide to Architecture in Los Angeles and Southern California, alongside works by Frank Lloyd Wright, Frank Gehry, and other major architects.

Rucker discusses the building and rebuilding of both structures in his book, "Trial by Fire: A Tale of Two Houses."

Cultural-Historical Landmark
On October 19, 2017, a 1964 home designed by Rucker known as The Hogan Residence, located at 8527 Brier Drive, Los Angeles, CA, 90046, was designated a Cultural-Historical Landmark (HCM 1152) by the City of Los Angeles Cultural Heritage Commission. The home was published on Curbed in 2019.https://la.curbed.com/2019/5/6/18528441/midcentury-home-tour-los-angeles-doug-rucker-laurel-canyon

Other Notable Projects

Malibu, California 
 Water Tower House
 Jack Warden residence - Malibu Movie Colony (Actor)
 Kris Kristofferson residence (Actor/singer)
 Mike Bright residence (Olympic Athlete)
 Munro House
 Muller House
 Knebel House
 Craft House

Published Books
Trail By Fire: a Tale of Two Houses
Building a Home That Loves You.

External links
 The Value of Architecture - Improvisation and Common Sense: the Architecture of Doug Rucker
 Doug Rucker interview: The Face of Malibu by Johanna Spinks

Further reading 
 Sunset Magazine, January 1965. p. 80. (Evans House)
 Los Angeles Times Home Magazine, March 21, 1965. p. 22.
 "Death of a House". Doug Rucker. Los Angeles Times Home Magazine, November 22, 1970. p. 46.
 "The House That Rose From the Ashes". Doug Rucker. Los Angeles Times Home Magazine, August 11, 1974. p. 10.
 "View From Malibu". Bruce David Colen. Architectural Digest, July 1987. p. 96.
 Sunset Magazine, May 1990. p. 184. (Guffey House)
 Angeles Magazine, September 1991. p. 89.
 Growing Edge. Doug Rucker (2005). Vilmapubco, Malibu, CA.

References 

20th-century American architects
1927 births
Living people
University of Illinois School of Architecture alumni